Herston is a village on South Ronaldsay, Orkney, Scotland, United Kingdom. Herston is historically a fishing village but its only industry to speak of is Herston Stained Glass, now that Herston Hikers Hostel is now inactive.

The video for the Eurythmics song, "Here Comes the Rain Again", was partially filmed in Herston, at the wreck of the WWI-era ship, Monarch.

References

External links

Scapaflow.co - Herston, South Ronaldsay
Canmore - Fishing Vessel site record, Widewall Bay

Villages in Orkney